Instant replay is the process of replaying previously occurred events through the use of video technology.

Instant replay may also refer to:

Media
Instant Replay (Dan Hartman album), 1978
Instant Replay (magazine-format video)
Instant Replay (The Monkees album), 1969
Instant Replay (Pizzicato Five album), 1993
"Instant Replay" (song), a 1978 song by Dan Hartman
Instant Replay (book), a 1968 book by Jerry Kramer

Sports
Instant replay in American and Canadian football
Instant replay in Major League Baseball
Instant Replay, a weekly sports highlight program on WGN-TV
Instant Replay Game, a National Football League (NFL) game notable for its controversial use of instant replay